The Panamanian Football Federation, known as FEPAFUT, is the official governing body of football in Panama and is in charge of the Panama national football team.  FEPAFUT was a founding member of CONCACAF in 1961.

Association staff

See also 
Football in Panama

References

External links
  Official website
 Panama at the FIFA website
 Panama at CONCACAF site

Panama
Football in Panama
Pan
Football
Sports organizations established in 1937
1937 establishments in Panama